This is a list of nursing schools in the United States of America, sorted by state. A nursing school is a school that teaches people how to be nurses (medical professionals who care for individuals, families, or communities in order to attain or maintain health and quality of life).

Alabama

Alaska
 University of Alaska Anchorage School of Nursing, Anchorage

Arizona
Arizona College, Mesa
Arizona State University, Phoenix
Arizona Western College, Yuma
Brookline College School of Nursing, Phoenix
Brown Mackie College, Phoenix
Carrington College, Phoenix
Central Arizona College, Coolidge
Chamberlain College of Nursing, Phoenix
Chandler-Gilbert Community College, Chandler
Cochise Community College, Sierra Vista
Coconino Community College, Flagstaff
Eastern Arizona College, Thatcher
Estrella Mountain Community College, Avondale
Everest College, Phoenix
GateWay Community College, Phoenix
Glendale Community College, Glendale
Grand Canyon University, Phoenix
ITT Technical Institute, Phoenix
Mesa Community College, Mesa
Mohave Community College, Lake Havasu City
Northern Arizona University, Flagstaff
Northland Pioneer College, Holbrook
Paradise Valley Community College, Phoenix
Phoenix College, Phoenix
Pima Community College, Tucson
Pima Medical Institute, Mesa and Tucson
Scottsdale Community College, Scottsdale
University of Arizona, Tucson
University of Phoenix, Phoenix
Yavapai College, Prescott

Arkansas
Arkansas State University School of Nursing, Jonesboro
Baptist Health School of Nursing, Little Rock 
Jefferson Regional Medical Center School of Nursing, Pine Bluff
Southeast Arkansas College Allied Health & Nursing, Pine Bluff
University of Arkansas at Monticello, Monticello 
University of Arkansas at Pine Bluff School of Nursing, Pine Bluff 
University of Arkansas for Medical Sciences College of Nursing, Little Rock
University of Central Arkansas, Conway

California
 American National University, eUniversity California 
 Azusa Pacific University School of Nursing, Azusa 
 California Baptist University College of Nursing, Riverside
 California State University, Bakersfield Department of Nursing, Bakersfield 
 California State University, Chico
 California State University, Dominguez Hills School of Nursing, Carson 
 California State University, East Bay
 California State University, Fresno
 California State University, Fullerton School of Nursing, Fullerton 
 California State University, Long Beach School of Nursing, Long Beach 
 California State University, Los Angeles School of Nursing, Los Angeles
 California State University, Northridge
 California State University, Sacramento
 California State University, San Bernardino Department of Nursing, San Bernardino 
 California State University, Stanislaus
 Chaffey College Nursing Program, Rancho Cucamonga
 East Los Angeles Community College, Monterey Park
 Glendale Community College, Glendale
 Loma Linda University School of Nursing, Loma Linda 
 Los Angeles City College, Los Angeles
 Los Angeles County College of Nursing and Allied Health, Los Angeles
 Los Angeles Trade Technical College, Los Angeles
 Mount St. Mary's College Department of Nursing, Los Angeles
 Mount San Antonio College, Walnut
 Pasadena City College, Pasadena
 Rio Hondo College, Whittier 
 Riverside City College School of Nursing, Riverside
 Samuel Merritt University, Oakland 
 San Bernardino Valley College Nursing Department, San Bernardino
 San Diego State University College of Health & Human Services School of Nursing, San Diego
 San Francisco State University
 San José State University
 Sonoma State University, Rohnert Park
 University of California, Davis School of Nursing, Sacramento
 University of California, Irvine Sue and Bill Gross School of Nursing
 University of California, Los Angeles School of Nursing, Los Angeles
 University of California, San Francisco School of Nursing, San Francisco
 University of San Francisco
 University of Southern California Keck School of Medicine
 Victor Valley College, Victorville 
 West Coast University
 West Hills College Lemoore, Lemoore 
 Western University of Health Sciences College of Graduate Nursing, Pomona

Colorado
Adams State University, Alamosa
American National University, eUniversity Colorado 
Beth-El College of Nursing & Health Sciences, Colorado Springs
Colorado State University–Pueblo
Denver School of Nursing
Regis University, Denver
University of Colorado Denver College of Nursing, Aurora
University of Northern Colorado, Greeley

Connecticut
 American National University, eUniversity Connecticut 
Central Connecticut State University, New Britain
Fairfield University School of Nursing, Fairfield
Quinnipiac University, Hamden
Sacred Heart University, Fairfield
St. Vincent's College, Bridgeport
Southern Connecticut State University, New Haven
University of Connecticut School of Nursing, Storrs
University of Saint Joseph, West Hartford
Western Connecticut State University, Danbury
Yale School of Nursing, New Haven

Delaware
 Beebe School of Nursing, Lewes
 Delaware State University, Dover
 Delaware Technical Community College, Georgetown, Dover, and Stanton
 University of Delaware, Newark

Florida
Adventist University of Health Sciences, Orlando
American National University, eUniversity Florida 
Barry University (BSN), Miami Shores
Florida Atlantic University (BSN, MSN, DNP, & Ph.D.), Boca Raton
Florida Education Institute (ASN, LPN), Miami
Florida International University (BSN), University Park
Hillsborough Community College (ADN), Hillsborough County
Jacksonville University (BSN, MSN), Jacksonville
Keiser University (ADN), Jacksonville and multiple other campuses
Mercy Hospital College of Nursing (ASN), Miami
Nova Southeastern University (BSN, MSN), Davie
Polk State College (ADN), Winter Haven
Rasmussen College (ADN, BSN), Fort Myers 
Santa Fe College (ASN, RN-BSN), Gainesville
State College of Florida, Manatee-Sarasota, (ASN, BSN), Bradenton 
St. Johns River State College (ASN), Orange Park and Palatka
St. Petersburg College (BSN), St. Petersburg
Southwest Florida Technical Institute (CNA, LPN, RN, BSN), Bradenton
South University (BSN), Tampa and West Palm Beach
University of Central Florida (BSN), Orlando
University of Florida College of Nursing (BSN, RN-BSN, MSN, DNP, and Ph.D.), Gainesville
University of Miami (BSN, MSN, DNP, Ph.D.), Coral Gables
University of South Florida (BSN, MSN), Tampa
University of Tampa (BSN, MSN), Tampa
University of West Florida (BSN), Pensacola
Utica University (accelerated BSN), St. Petersburg

Georgia
 Abraham Baldwin Agricultural College Division of Nursing and Health Sciences, Tifton
 Albany State University Darton College of Health Professions, Albany
 Armstrong Atlantic State University Department of Nursing, Savannah
 Athens Technical College Associate Degree Nursing Program, Athens
 Augusta State University Department of Nursing, Augusta
 Brenau University Department of Nursing, Gainesville
 Clayton State University School of Health Sciences Department of Nursing, Morrow
 Coastal Georgia Community College Department of Nursing, Brunswick
 Columbus State University Department of Nursing, Columbus
 Columbus Technical College Associate Degree Nursing, Columbus
 Dalton State College Nursing Department, Dalton
 Emory University, Nell Hodgson Woodruff School of Nursing, Atlanta
 Floyd College Division of Nursing Education, Rome
 Georgia Baptist College of Nursing of Mercer University, Atlanta
 Georgia College and State University School of Health Sciences, Milledgeville
 Georgia Gwinnett College School of Health Sciences, Lawrenceville
 Georgia Perimeter College Associate Degree Nursing Department, Clarkston
 Georgia Regents University College of Nursing, Augusta (satellite campuses in Athens and Columbus)
 Georgia Southern University School of Nursing, Statesboro
 Georgia Southwestern State University School of Nursing, Americus
 Georgia State University, Byrdine F. Lewis School of Nursing and Health Professions, Atlanta
 Gordon College Division of Nursing and Health Sciences, Barnesville
 Kennesaw State University Wellstar School of Nursing, Kennesaw
 LaGrange College Division of Nursing, LaGrange
 Macon State College Division of Nursing, Macon
 Middle Georgia College Department of Nursing, Cochran
 North Georgia College and State University Department of Nursing, Dahlonega
 Northwestern Technical College Associate Degree Nursing Program, Rock Spring
 Piedmont University R. H. Daniel School of Nursing, Demorest
 South Georgia College Division of Nursing, Douglas
 Southwest Georgia Technical College Associate Degree Nursing Program, Thomasville
 Thomas University Department of Nursing, Thomasville
 University of West Georgia Department of Nursing, Carrollton
 Valdosta State University College of Nursing, Valdosta
 West Central Technical College Associate Degree Nursing Program, Waco

Hawaii
 Chaminade University of Honolulu School of Nursing, Honolulu
 Hawaii Community College Division of Nursing and Allied Health, Hilo 
 Hawaii Pacific University, Honolulu
 Kapiolani Community College Nursing Program, Honolulu]
 Kauai Community College Nursing Program, Līhu'e 
 Maui Community College Nursing Career Ladder, Kahului

Idaho
Boise State University, Boise
Brigham Young University–Idaho, Rexburg
College of Eastern Idaho, Idaho Falls, Idaho
College of Southern Idaho, Twin Falls
College of Western Idaho, Nampa, Idaho
Idaho State University, Pocatello
Lewis–Clark State College, Lewiston
North Idaho College, Coeur d' Alene, Idaho

Illinois
ATS Institute of Technology, Chicago 
Aurora University, Aurora
Bradley University, Peoria
Capitol Area School of Nursing, Springfield
Chamberlain College of Nursing, Downers Grove, Illinois
DePaul University Department of Nursing, Chicago
Elgin Community College Nursing Program, Elgin
Graham Hospital School of Nursing, Canton 
Harper College Nursing Program, Palatine
Harry S Truman College, Chicago 
Heartland Community College, Bloomington
Lewis University Online, Romeoville 
Loyola University Chicago
Mennonite College of Nursing at Illinois State University, Normal
Millikin University, Decatur 
North Park University, Chicago
Northbrook College of Health Care, Wheeling 
Northern Illinois University, DeKalb
Omega Health Care Technical School, Evanston 
PCCTI, Chicago
Prairie State College, Chicago Heights 
Resurrection University, Chicago
Richland Community College, Decatur
Saint Anthony College of Nursing, Rockford 
Saint Francis Medical Center College of Nursing, Peoria 
Saint Xavier University, Chicago
St. John's College of Nursing, Springfield
South Suburban College, South Holland
Southern Illinois University Edwardsville, Edwardsville 
University of Illinois at Chicago

Indiana
 Ball State University School of Nursing, Muncie
 Goshen College Nursing Department, Goshen 
 Indiana State University, Terre Haute 
 Indiana University, Bloomington 
 Indiana University, Kokomo 
 Indiana University East, Richmond
 Indiana University Northwest, Gary
 Indiana University-Purdue University, Indianapolis
 Marian University School of Nursing, Indianapolis
 Purdue University, West Lafayette
 Saint Mary's College Nursing School, Notre Dame
 University of Indianapolis School of Nursing, Indianapolis
 University of Southern Indiana College of Nursing, Evansville 
 Valparaiso University College of Nursing, Valparaiso
 University of Saint Francis School of Nursing, Fort Wayne

Iowa
 Allen College School of Nursing, Waterloo 
 Des Moines Area Community College School of Nursing, Ankeny 
 Luther College Nursing Program, Decorah
 Mercy College of Health Sciences College of Nursing, Des Moines
 Signature Healthcare, Des Moines
 University of Iowa College of Nursing, Iowa City

Kansas
Baker University School of Nursing, Baldwin City
Barton Community College, Great Bend
Benedictine College, Department of Nursing, Atchison
Bethel College, North Newton
Butler Community College, El Dorado
Cloud County Community College, Nursing Department, Concordia
Coffeyville Community College, Coffeyville
Colby Community College, Department of Nursing, Colby 
Dodge City Community College, Dodge City
Donnelly College, Kansas City
Emporia State University, Department of Nursing, Emporia
Fort Hays State University, Department of Nursing, Hays
Fort Scott Community College, Nursing Department, Fort Scott
Garden City Community College, Garden City
Hesston College, Hesston
Highland Community College Technical Center, Atchison
Hutchinson Community College, Hutchinson
Johnson County Community College School of Nursing, Overland Park
Kansas City Kansas Community College, Division of Allied Health & Nursing, Kansas City
Kansas Wesleyan University, Division of Nursing Education and Health Science, Salina
Labette Community College, Nursing Department, Parsons
Manhattan Area Technical College, Manhattan
MidAmerica Nazarene University, School of Nursing, Olathe
Neosho County Community College, Mary Grimes School of Nursing, Chanute and Ottawa
Newman University, School of Nursing and Allied Health, Wichita
North Central Kansas Technical College, Hays
Ottawa University, RN to BSN, Ottawa
Pittsburg State University School of Nursing, Pittsburg
Pratt Community College, Pratt
Rasmussen University, Overland Park
Salina Area Technical College, Salina
Seward County Community College, Liberal
Southwestern College Professional Studies, RN to BSN, Wichita
University of Kansas School of Nursing, Kansas City
University of Saint Mary, Division of Nursing, Leavenworth
Washburn University School of Nursing, Topeka
Wichita State University School of Nursing, Wichita

Kentucky
 American National University, Pikeville 
 University of Pikeville, Pikeville
 Big Sandy Community and Technical College, Prestonsburg
 Galen College of Nursing, Louisville 
 Northern Kentucky University Department of Nursing, Highland Heights
 Eastern Kentucky University Department of Nursing, Richmond
 Spalding University School of Nursing, Louisville 
 University of Kentucky College of Nursing, Lexington 
 University of Louisville School of Nursing, Louisville
 Western Kentucky University Department of Nursing, Bowling Green

Louisiana
Baton Rouge Community College, Baton Rouge
Baton Rouge General Hospital School of Nursing (Diploma in Nursing), Baton Rouge
Bossier Parish Community College, Bossier City
Delgado Community College Charity Hospital School of Nursing (now called Charity-Delgado) (ADN), New Orleans
Dillard University Division of Nursing (BSN), New Orleans 
Fletcher Technical Community College, Houma
Grambling State University School of Nursing (BSN, MSN), Grambling 
Louisiana Christian University Division of Nursing, Pineville 
Louisiana Delta Community College, Monroe
Louisiana State University at Alexandria, Alexandria
Louisiana State University at Eunice School of Nursing (ADN), Eunice 
Louisiana State University Health Science Center, School of Nursing, New Orleans
Louisiana Tech University, Ruston
Loyola University School of Nursing (BSN, MSN), New Orleans 
McNeese State University College of Nursing (BSN, MSN), Lake Charles 
Nicholls State University, Thibodaux
Northwestern State University College of Nursing, Natchitoches and Shreveport 
Our Lady of Holy Cross College School of Nursing, New Orleans 
Our Lady of the Lake University, Baton Rouge
Southeastern Louisiana University School of Nursing, Hammond 
Southern University and A&M College, Baton Rouge 
Southern University at Shreveport School of Nursing, Shreveport
University of Louisiana at Lafayette School of Nursing, Lafayette
University of Louisiana at Monroe School of Nursing, Monroe
William Carey University, Joseph and Nancy Fail School of Nursing, New Orleans

Maine
Central Maine Community College, Auburn
Central Maine Medical Center College of Nursing and Health Professions, Lewiston
Eastern Maine Community College, Bangor
Husson University, Bangor
Kennebec Valley Community College, Fairfield
Maine College of Health Professions, Lewiston
Northern Maine Community College, Presque Isle
Saint Joseph's College of Maine, Standish
Southern Maine Community College, South Portland
University of Maine School of Nursing, Orono
University of Maine at Augusta, Augusta
University of Maine at Fort Kent, Fort Kent
University of New England, Biddeford and Portland
University of Southern Maine School of Nursing, Portland and Lewiston

Maryland
Bachelor's degree programs or higher:
 Bowie State University Bachelor's degree Nursing Program, Bowie
 Coppin State University Bachelor's degree Nursing Program, Baltimore
 Hood College, Bachelor's degree Nursing Program, Frederick
 Johns Hopkins School of Nursing Second Degree Bachelor/Master/Doctorate Degree Nursing Program, Baltimore
 Morgan State University Bachelor's degree Nursing Program, Baltimore
 Notre Dame of Maryland University Bachelor's degree Nursing Program, Baltimore
 Salisbury University Bachelor/Master's degree Nursing Program, Salisbury
 Stevenson University Bachelor/Master's degree Nursing Program, Stevenson
 Towson University Bachelor/Master's degree Nursing Program, Towson
 University of Maryland at Baltimore Bachelor/Master/Doctorate Degree Nursing Program, Baltimore
 Washington Adventist University Bachelor's degree Nursing Program, Takoma Park

Associate degree programs:
 Allegany College of Maryland, Associate Degree Nursing Program, Cumberland
 Anne Arundel Community College Associate Degree Nursing Program, Arnold
 Baltimore City Community College Associate Degree Nursing Program, Baltimore
 Carroll Community College Associate Degree Nursing Program, Westminster
 Cecil College, Associate Degree Nursing Program, North East
 Chesapeake College Associate Degree Nursing Program, Wye Mills
 College of Southern Maryland Associate Degree Nursing Program, La Plata
 Community College of Baltimore County Associate Degree Nursing Program, Essex and Catonsville
 Frederick Community College, Associate Degree Nursing Program, Frederick
 Hagerstown Community College, Associate Degree Nursing Program, Hagerstown
 Harford Community College Associate Degree Nursing Program, Bel Air
 Howard Community College, Associate Degree Nursing Program, Columbia
 Montgomery College Associate Degree Nursing Program, Takoma Park/Silver Spring
 Prince George's Community College Associate Degree Nursing Program, Largo
 Wor-Wic Community College Associate Degree Nursing Program, Salisbury

Massachusetts
Anna Maria College, Paxton 
Becker College, Worcester
Boston College Connell School of Nursing, Boston 
Brockton Hospital School of Nursing/Fisher College
Curry College, Milton
Elms College, Chicopee
Emmanuel College, Boston 
Endicott College, Beverly
Framingham State University. Framingham
Fitchburg State University, Fitchburg
Holyoke Community College, Holyoke
Lawrence Memorial/Regis College Nursing Program, Medford 
Massachusetts Bay Community College, Wellesley
MGH Institute of Health Professions, Boston
Mount Wachusett Community College, Nursing Department, Gardner
Northeastern University Bouvé College of Health Sciences, Boston 
Quinsigamond Community College, Worcester
Regis College School of Nursing, Science and Health Professions, Weston 
Salem State University, Salem
Simmons College, Boston
Springfield Technical Community College, Springfield 
University of Massachusetts
Amherst 
Boston 
Dartmouth 
Lowell 
Graduate School of Nursing (Worcester)
Worcester State University, Worcester

Michigan
Eastern Michigan University College of Health and Human Services School of Nursing, Ypsilanti
Grand Valley State University Kirkhof College of Nursing, Allendale
Kirtland Community College, Roscommon
Lake Superior State University School of Nursing, Sault Sainte Marie 
Macomb Community College, Warren
Michigan State University College of Nursing, East Lansing 
Mid Michigan Community College, Harrison
Northern Michigan University School of Nursing, Marquette
Oakland Community College, Waterford
Oakland University School of Nursing, Rochester
University of Detroit Mercy College of Health Professions McAuley School of Nursing, Detroit 
University of Michigan School of Nursing, Ann Arbor 
Washtenaw Community College, Ann Arbor
Wayne State University College of Nursing, Detroit
Western Michigan University Bronson School of Nursing, Kalamazoo

Minnesota
 Alexandria Technical College Associate Degree Nursing Program, Alexandria
 Anoka-Ramsey Community College Associate Degree Nursing Program, Coon Rapids
 Bemidji State University Baccalaureate Nursing Program Department of Nursing, Bemidji
 Bethel University Nursing Department, St. Paul
 Central Lakes College Associate Degree Nursing Program, Brainerd
 College of St. Benedict/St. John's University Department of Nursing, St. Joseph
 College of St. Catherine Associate Degree Nursing Program, Minneapolis
 College of St. Catherine Department of Nursing, St. Paul
 The College of St. Scholastica Department of Nursing, Duluth
 Concordia College, Moorhead Nursing Program, Moorhead 
 Crown College Baccalaureate Nursing Program, St. Bonifacius
 Fond du Lac Tribal and Community College/Lake Superior College Nursing Program, Cloquet
 Gustavus Adolphus College and St. Olaf College Minnesota Intercollegiate Nursing Consortium
 Northfield
 St. Peter
 Hibbing Community College Program in Nursing, Hibbing
 Itasca Community College, Grand Rapids
 Rainy River Community College, International Falls
 Vermilion Community College, Ely
 Inver Hills-Century Colleges Associate Degree Nursing Program
 Century College, White Bear Lake
 Inver Hills Community College, Inver Grove Heights
 Lake Superior College Associate Degree Nursing Program, Duluth
 Metropolitan State University School of Nursing, St. Paul
 Minneapolis Community and Technical College Associate Degree Nursing Program, Minneapolis
 Minnesota State College Southeast - Southeast Technical Associate in Science - Nursing Mobility Program (RN)
 Red Wing Satellite site, Red Wing
 Winona Campus, Winona
 Minnesota State Community and Technical College Associate Degree Nursing Program
 Detroit Lakes
 Fergus Falls
 Moorhead
 Wadena
 Minnesota State University, Mankato School of Nursing, Mankato
 Minnesota State University Moorhead Baccalaureate Nursing Program, Moorhead
 Minnesota West Community and Technical College Associate Degree Nursing
 Pipestone
 Worthington
 Normandale Community College Nursing Program, Bloomington
 North Hennepin Community College Nursing Program
 Brooklyn Park
 St. Cloud
 Northland Community and Technical College Associate in Science Degree - Nursing Program
 East Grand Forks
 Thief River Falls
 Owatonna College and University Center, Owatonna
 Pine Technical College, Pine City
 Presentation College (South Dakota) Baccalaureate Nursing Program
 Aberdeen, South Dakota
 Fairmont
 Richfield Campus-Globe University/Minnesota School of Business Bachelor of Science in Nursing Program (BSN), Richfield
 Ridgewater College Associate Degree Nursing Program
 Hutchinson
 Willmar
 Riverland Community College Associate Degree Nursing Program
 Albert Lea
 Austin
 Rochester Community and Technical College Associate Degree Nursing Program, Rochester
 St. Cloud State University Department of Nursing Science, St. Cloud
 South Central College Associate Degree Nursing Program
 Faribault
 North Mankato
 University of Minnesota School of Nursing, Minneapolis
 University of Minnesota Rochester, Rochester
 White Earth Tribal and Community College, Mahnomen
 Winona State University College of Nursing and Health Sciences Department of Nursing
 Rochester
 Winona

Mississippi
 Delta State University, Cleveland
 Mississippi College, Clinton
 Mississippi Gulf Coast Community College, multiple locations
 Mississippi University for Women, Columbus
 University of Mississippi Medical Center, Jackson
 University of Southern Mississippi, Hattiesburg
 Alcorn State University, Lorman

Missouri
 Avila University School of Nursing - College of Science & Health, Kansas City
 Columbia College Nursing Department, Columbia
 Crowder College, Neosho
 Cox College, Springfield
 East Central College, Union
 Goldfarb School of Nursing at Barnes-Jewish College, St. Louis
 Hannibal–LaGrange University Craigmiles School of Nursing, Hannibal
 Jefferson College, Hillsboro
 Lincoln University, Fort Leonard Wood
 Maryville University School of Nursing, St. Louis
 Metropolitan Community College Penn Valley, Kansas City
 Mineral Area College, Park Hills
 Missouri State University School of Nursing, West Plains
 Moberly Area Community College, Moberly
 North Central Missouri College, Trenton and Maryville
 Ozarks Technical Community College, Springfield
 Research College of Nursing, Kansas City
 Rockhurst University Saint Luke's College of Nursing and Health Sciences, Kansas City
 Southeast Missouri Hospital College of Nursing and Health Sciences, Cape Girardeau
 Southwest Baptist University College of Health Professions, Springfield
 St. Charles Community College, St. Peters
 St. Louis Community College, St. Louis
 State Fair Community College, Sedalia
 State Technical College of Missouri, Linn
 University of Missouri Sinclair School of Nursing, Columbia
 University of Missouri–Kansas City School of Nursing, Kansas City
 University of Missouri–St. Louis School of Nursing, St. Louis
 Three Rivers College, Poplar Bluff
 Truman State University School of Nursing, Kirksville

Montana
Carroll College, Helena
Montana State University College of Nursing, Bozeman 
Salish Kootenai College, Pablo

Nebraska
Clarkson College, Omaha
College of Saint Mary, Nursing Program, Omaha
Creighton University, Omaha
Nebraska Methodist College, Omaha
Nebraska Wesleyan University, Nursing Program, Lincoln
University of Nebraska Medical Center, Omaha

Nevada

 Arizona College School of Nursing, Las Vegas
 College of Southern Nevada, Clark County
 Great Basin College, Elko
 Roseman University of Health Sciences, Accelerated BSN, Las Vegas
 Truckee Meadows Community College, Reno
 UNLV School of Nursing, Las Vegas
 University of Nevada, Reno, Reno
 Western Nevada College, Carson City

New Hampshire

 Colby-Sawyer College, New London
 Great Bay Community College, Portsmouth
 Keene State College, Keene
 Lakes Region Community College, Laconia
 Manchester Community College, Manchester
 Massachusetts College of Pharmacy and Health Sciences, Manchester
 Nashua Community College, Nashua
 NHTI, Concord's Community College, Concord
 Plymouth State University, Plymouth
 River Valley Community College, Claremont
 Rivier University, Nashua
 Saint Anselm College, Goffstown
 Saint Joseph School of Nursing, Nashua
 University of New Hampshire Department of Nursing, Durham
 White Mountains Community College, Berlin

New Jersey
 County College of Morris, Nursing Department, Randolph 
 Mountainside Hospital School of Nursing, Montclair
 Rutgers Biomedical and Health Sciences, several locations
 Seton Hall University, College of Nursing, South Orange
 The College of New Jersey School of Nursing, Ewing
 The William Paterson University School of Nursing, Wayne NJ
 Ramapo College of New Jersey, School of Nursing, Mahwah, New Jersey

New Mexico

 Eastern New Mexico University Nursing Department, Roswell 
 New Mexico State University School of Nursing, Las Cruces 
 University of New Mexico College of Nursing, Albuquerque

New York 

 Adelphi University School of Nursing, Garden City
 Binghamton University, SUNY, Decker School of Nursing, Binghamton 
 Broome Community College, SUNY, Binghamton
 D'Youville University, Buffalo 
 Ellis School of Nursing, Schenectady 
 Excelsior College School of Nursing, Albany 
 Farmingdale State College, SUNY, Department of Nursing, Farmingdale 
 Fulton-Montgomery Community College, Johnstown
 Hartwick College, Oneonta 
 Molloy University, Barbara Hagan School of Nursing, Rockville Centre, New York
 Mount Saint Mary College Newburgh
 Pomeroy College of Nursing at Crouse Hospital, Syracuse 
 Roberts Wesleyan College School of Nursing, Rochester, New York
 Russell Sage College School of Nursing, BSN and MSN programs, Troy
 St. John Fisher College, Rochester
 Saint Joseph's College, MS and BSN Nursing programs, Brooklyn and Patchogue 
 St. Joseph's College of Nursing, Syracuse
 St. Peter’s Hospital College of Nursing, Albany
 Samaritan Hospital School of Nursing, Albany
 Stony Brook University, SUNY, School of Nursing, Stony Brook
 Trocaire College, Catherine McAuley School of Nursing Buffalo
 University at Buffalo, SUNY, School of Nursing, Buffalo
 University of Rochester, Helen Wood Hall School of Nursing, Rochester
 Utica University Accelerated Second Degree (BS), Syracuse

New York City 
 Bronx Community College CUNY, New York City
 College of Mount Saint Vincent, Riverdale, Bronx, New York City
 Columbia University School of Nursing, New York City
 CUNY Lehman College School of Nursing, The Bronx, New York City
 CUNY School of Professional Studies Online, New York City
 Helene Fuld College of Nursing, New York City 
 Hunter-Bellevue School of Nursing, Hunter College, CUNY, New York City
 Long Island College Hospital School of Nursing, Brooklyn, New York City 
 New Age Training Business School, New York City
 New York University College of Nursing, New York City
 Pace University School of Nursing, New York City and Pleasantville
 Phillips Beth Israel School of Nursing, New York City
 Touro School of Nursing, Brooklyn, New York City

Defunct in New York (state) 
 Harlem Hospital, Harlem Hospital School of Nursing, New York City
 Lincoln Hospital, Lincoln School for Nurses, New York City

North Carolina

Appalachian State University School of Nursing, Boone
Cabarrus College of Health Sciences  Louise Harkey School of Nursing, Concord
Cape Fear Community College, Wilmington
Duke University School of Nursing, Durham
East Carolina University College of Nursing, Greenville
Fayetteville Technical Community College, Fayetteville
North Carolina Central University School of Nursing, Durham
University of North Carolina at Chapel Hill School of Nursing, Chapel Hill
University of North Carolina at Charlotte School of Nursing, Charlotte
University of North Carolina at Greensboro School of Nursing, Greensboro
University of North Carolina at Wilmington School of Nursing, Wilmington
Wake Forest University Department of Health and Exercise Science, Winston-Salem
Wake Technical Community College  Health Sciences Department, Raleigh
Watts School of Nursing, Durham
Winston Salem State University School of Nursing, Winston-Salem

North Dakota
 Dickinson State University Department of Nursing, Dickinson
 University of Jamestown Department of Nursing, Jamestown
 Lake Region State College Dakota Nursing Program, Devils Lake
 Medcenter One College of Nursing, Bismarck
 Minot State University College of Nursing, Minot
 North Dakota State College of Science, Wahpeton
 North Dakota State University, Fargo
 Tri-College University Nursing Consortium
Concordia College, Moorhead, Minnesota
Minnesota State University Moorhead, Moorhead, Minnesota
North Dakota State University, Fargo
 United Tribes Technical College, Bismarck
 University of Mary Division of Nursing, Bismarck
 University of North Dakota College of Nursing, Grand Forks

Ohio

 Ashland University School of Nursing, Ashland 
 Case Western Reserve University Frances Payne Bolton School of Nursing, Cleveland
 Cedarville University School of Nursing, Cedarville 
 Christ College of Nursing and Health Sciences, Cincinnati
 Clark State Community College, Springfield
 Cleveland State University School of Nursing, Cleveland
 Columbus State Community College, Columbus
 Franciscan University of Steubenville, Steubenville
 Hiram College School of Nursing, Hiram
 Kent State University College of Nursing, Kent
 Kent State University at Ashtabula, Ashtabula
 Kent State University at East Liverpool, East Liverpool
 Kent State University at Salem, Salem
 Kent State University at Stark, Jackson Township
 Kettering College, Kettering
 Lorain County Community College, Elyria
 Lourdes University, Sylvania
 MedCentral College of Nursing, Mansfield
 Miami University, Oxford 
 Mount Carmel College of Nursing, Columbus
 Notre Dame College, South Euclid 
 Ohio Northern University, Ada 
 Ohio State University College of Nursing, Columbus
 Ohio University School of Nursing, Athens
 Otterbein University, Westerville
 Sinclair Community College, Dayton
 Springfield Regional School of Nursing, Springfield 
 University of Akron, Akron
 Walsh University, North Canton
 Wright State University College of Nursing and Health, Dayton
!-- Please use proper formatting when adding to this list.  (see Kentucky for example) -->

Oklahoma

Cameron University Bachelor's degree with OU College of Nursing, Lawton 
Cameron University Associate Degree with Western Oklahoma State College, Lawton
Oklahoma City University, Kramer School of Nursing, Oklahoma City 
Oklahoma Wesleyan University School of Nursing, Bartlesville 
University of Central Oklahoma Edmond 
University of Oklahoma College of Nursing, Oklahoma City 
Western Oklahoma State College, Altus
Tulsa Community College, Tulsa
Rogers State College, Claremore
Oklahoma State University Institute of Technology, Okmulgee
Northeastern State University, Tahlequah

Oregon

Concordia University, Portland School of Nursing, Portland 
George Fox University, School of Nursing, Newberg
Linfield College Good Samaritan School of Nursing, Portland
Oregon Health & Science University School of Nursing, Portland
University of Portland School of Nursing, Portland
Walla Walla University, School of Nursing, Portland

Pennsylvania

 Carlow University College of Health & Wellness, Pittsburgh, PA
 Drexel University College of Nursing and Health Professions Nursing Program, Philadelphia
 Duquesne University School of Nursing Nursing Program, Pittsburgh
 Gannon University Nursing Program, Erie 
 Gwynedd Mercy University, Gwynedd Valley, Pennsylvania
 Holy Family University Nursing Program, Northeast Philadelphia
 Jefferson Abington Hospital Dixon School of Nursing, Willow Grove
 Methodist Hospital School of Nursing, Philadelphia
 Mount Aloysius College, Cresson 
 Northeastern Hospital School of Nursing part of the Temple University Health System, with science courses provided through the Community College of Philadelphia, Philadelphia
 Ohio Valley Hospital School of Nursing, Kennedy Township
 Pennsylvania College of Health Sciences, Lancaster 
 Pennsylvania State University School of Nursing, Hershey and University Park 
 Pottsville Hospital School of Nursing, Pottsville
 Roxborough Memorial Hospital School of Nursing, Philadelphia
 St. Luke's School of Nursing, Bethlehem 
 Thomas Jefferson University, Jefferson College of Health Professions Department of Nursing, Philadelphia
 University of Pennsylvania School of Nursing, Philadelphia
 University of Pittsburgh School of Nursing, Pittsburgh 
 UPMC Shadyside School of Nursing, Pittsburgh
 Villanova University College of Nursing, Villanova
 Widener University Online RN-BSN, Chester
York College of Pennsylvania, York

Rhode Island

Community College of Rhode Island, Warwick
New England Institute of Technology School of Nursing, East Greenwich
Rhode Island College School of Nursing, Providence 
Saint Joseph School of Nursing, North Providence
Salve Regina University School of Nursing, Newport
University of Rhode Island School of Nursing, Kingston

South Carolina

 Clemson University College of Nursing, Clemson 
 Francis Marion University College of Liberal Arts: Department of Nursing, Florence 
 Medical University of South Carolina School of Nursing, Charleston 
 University of South Carolina College of Nursing, Columbia 
 University of South Carolina Aiken School of Nursing, Aiken 
 University of South Carolina Upstate Mary Black School of Nursing, Spartanburg
 The Citadel Swain Department of Nursing, Charleston

South Dakota
 Dakota Wesleyan University Department of Nursing, Mitchell 
 Mount Marty University, Yankton
 Oglala Lakota College Nursing Program, Kyle 
 Presentation College Nursing Program, Aberdeen
 Sisseton Wahpeton College Nursing Program, Sisseton 
 South Dakota State University, College of Nursing, Brookings 
 University of South Dakota, Department of Nursing, Vermillion

Tennessee
Austin Peay State University, School of Nursing (BSN, MSN, FNP), Clarksville 
East Tennessee State University, College of Nursing (BSN, MSN, DNP), Johnson City
King College School of Nursing, Bristol
Marian University Accelerated BSN, Nashville 
Middle Tennessee State University School of Nursing, Murfreesboro
South College School of Nursing (BSN), Knoxville 
Tennessee State University College of Nursing, Nashville
Tennessee Technological University, School of Nursing (BSN, MSN), Cookeville
University of Memphis Loewenberg College of Nursing (BSN, MSN, FNP), Memphis
Vanderbilt University School of Nursing, Nashville

Texas

Utah
 Brigham Young University College of Nursing, Provo
 Eagle Gate College
 Fortis College
 Nightingale College,  Salt Lake City
 Provo College
 Roseman University of Health Sciences, Accelerated BSN, South Jordan 
 Salt Lake Community College
 Snow College, Ephraim
 Southern Utah University, Cedar City
 University of Utah School of Nursing, Salt Lake City
 Utah State University
 Utah Tech University, St. George
 Utah Valley University, Orem 
 Weber State University, Ogden
 Western Governors University, online, based in Salt Lake City, available nationwide
 Westminster College School of Nursing, Salt Lake City

Defunct in Utah
 Broadview University aka Utah Career College
 Dee Hospital School of Nursing, Ogden
 Everest College, West Valley City
 Dr. Groves LDS Hospital School of Nursing, Salt Lake
 Stevens Henager College

Vermont

Castleton State College, Castleton
Norwich University, Northfield
Southern Vermont College, Bennington
University of Vermont School of Nursing, Burlington
Vermont Technical College, Randolph Center

Virginia

Eastern Mennonite University School of Nursing, Harrisonburg
George Mason University School of Nursing, Fairfax
Hampton University School of Nursing, Hampton
James Madison University School of Nursing, Harrisonburg
Jefferson College of Health Sciences, Department of Nursing, Roanoke
Liberty University School of Nursing, Lynchburg
Lynchburg College School of Nursing, Lynchburg
Marymount University School of Nursing, Arlington
Norfolk State University School of Nursing, Norfolk
Old Dominion University School of Nursing, Norfolk
Radford University School of Nursing, Radford
Shenandoah University School of Nursing, Winchester
University of Virginia School of Nursing, Charlottesville
Virginia Commonwealth University School of Nursing, Richmond

Washington
Gonzaga University Department of Nursing, Spokane
MediCare Professionals, Training in Mental Development Online Nursing and Child Care Education Center 
Northwest University Buntain School of Nursing, Kirkland
Pacific Lutheran University School of Nursing, Tacoma 
Seattle University College of Nursing, Seattle 
University of Washington School of Nursing, Seattle 
Walla Walla University, School of Nursing, College Place 
Washington State University College of Nursing, Spokane

West Virginia
 Alderson-Broaddus College Department of Nursing, Philippi 
 Bluefield State College School of Nursing & Allied Health, Bluefield
 Davis & Elkins College RN program & RN to BSN, Elkins
 Fairmont State University School of Nursing & Allied Health Administration, Fairmont 
 Marshall University School of Nursing & Health Professions, Huntington 
 Shepherd University School of Nursing Education, Shepherdstown 
 West Liberty University Department of Nursing, West Liberty 
 West Virginia University Health Services Center School of Nursing, Morgantown

Wisconsin

 Alverno College, School of Nursing, Milwaukee
 Bellin College, School of Nursing, Green Bay 
 Blackhawk Technical College, Nursing Department, Janesville 
 Bryant & Stratton College, Glendale
 Cardinal Stritch University, Ruth S. Coleman College of Nursing, Milwaukee 
 Chippewa Valley Technical College, Eau Claire
 Concordia University Wisconsin, Mequon
 Fox Valley Technical College, Appleton
 Gateway Technical College, Burlington
 Herzing University, 5 locations
 Lakeshore Technical College, Cleveland
 Madison Area Technical College, Madison
 Marquette University, College of Nursing, Milwaukee
 Mid-State Technical College, Wisconsin Rapids
 Milwaukee Area Technical College, Milwaukee
 Milwaukee School of Engineering, School of Nursing, Milwaukee
 Moraine Park Technical College, Fond du Lac
 Mount Mary College, Department of Nursing, Milwaukee
 Nicolet Area Technical College, Rhinelander
 Northcentral Technical College, Wausau
 Northeast Wisconsin Technical College, multiple campuses
 Southwest Wisconsin Technical College, Fennimore
 University of Wisconsin–Eau Claire, College of Nursing and Health Sciences, Eau Claire 
 University of Wisconsin–Green Bay, Professional Program in Nursing, Green Bay
 University of Wisconsin–Madison, School of Nursing, Madison
 University of Wisconsin–Milwaukee, College of Nursing, Milwaukee
 University of Wisconsin–Oshkosh, College of Nursing, Oshkosh 
 University of Wisconsin–Parkside, College of Nursing, Kenosha 
 Viterbo University, School of Nursing, La Crosse
 Waukesha County Technical College, Pewaukee
 Western Technical College, La Crosse
 Wisconsin Indianhead Technical College, Superior 
 Wisconsin Lutheran College, Milwaukee/Wauwatosa

Wyoming
Casper College, Casper
Central Wyoming College, Riverton
Laramie County Community College, Cheyenne
Northern Wyoming Community College District, Gillette
Northern Wyoming Community College, Sheridan
Northwest College, Powell
 University of Wyoming Fay W. Whitney School of Nursing, Laramie 
Western Wyoming Community College, Rock Springs

District of Columbia
Catholic University of America School of Nursing
Georgetown University School of Nursing and Health Studies
George Washington University Graduate School of Nursing
Howard University Division of Nursing
Radians College
Misericordia University Nursing Program, 
Trinity Washington University
University of the District of Columbia School of Nursing

Guam
 University of Guam School of Nursing and Health Sciences, Mangilao

U.S. Virgin Islands
 University of the Virgin Islands Nursing Division, St. Thomas

Puerto Rico
 University of Puerto Rico Nursing School, San Juan, Puerto Rico
 Ana G. Mendez University - Universidad Metropolitana Nursing School, Cupey, San Juan; Bayamon

References

See also 

 List of nursing schools in Europe
 List of nursing schools in Malaysia

Nursing
United States